Azmin Azram Abdul Aziz (born 1 April 1976) is a former Malaysian footballer. He represented four state teams and one club team in his career. He also represented Malaysia from 1998 to 2004. Currently he is the goalkeeping coach of Malaysia national football team.

Azmin started his career with Kuala Lumpur youth team.

In 2002, Azmin was call up for an international friendly match against five times World Cup winners Brazil. He was selected as one of the first eleven to play against Brazilian stars such as Ronaldo and Barca's Ronaldinho.

He was guided by former Malaysia goalkeeper, Abdul Rashid Hassan and Lim Chuan Chin. Under the duo's guidance, Azmin earned the status of Malaysia's number one goalkeeper from 2002 to 2004 before his place was taken by Mohd Syamsuri Mustafa.

At the age of 30, he choose to retire after receiving knee injury. He has since worked as goalkeeper coach and scout talent at the National Sports Council.

Honours
Kuala Lumpur
 Malaysia FA Cup: 1993, 1994, 1999

Selangor
Malaysia Premier 1: 2000
Malaysia FA Cup: 2001
Malaysia Cup: 2002

Pahang
Malaysia Super League: 2004

Malaysia
Merdeka Cup runner-up: 2000

References

Living people
Malaysian people of Malay descent
Malaysian footballers
Malaysia international footballers
Selangor FA players
Kuala Lumpur City F.C. players
Sri Pahang FC players
Negeri Sembilan FA players
1976 births
People from Selangor
Footballers at the 2002 Asian Games
Association football goalkeepers
Asian Games competitors for Malaysia